Mario Lega (born 20 February 1949 in Lugo) is an Italian former professional Grand Prix motorcycle road racer. He won the FIM 250cc world championship in 1977 as a member of the Morbidelli factory racing team.

Grand Prix motorcycle racing results 
Points system from 1969 onwards:

(key) (Races in bold indicate pole position; races in italics indicate fastest lap)

References 

1949 births
Living people
People from Lugo, Emilia-Romagna
Italian motorcycle racers
250cc World Championship riders
350cc World Championship riders
500cc World Championship riders
Sportspeople from the Province of Ravenna
250cc World Riders' Champions